Wade Humphries sometimes spelt "Humphreys" is an Australian former professional rugby league footballer who played in the 2000s. He played for the Sydney Roosters in the NRL competition.

Playing career
Humphries made his first grade debut for the Sydney Roosters in round 17 of the 2002 NRL season against Canberra. Humphries started at hooker in the clubs 36-6 victory. Humphries played one further game for the club which was the following week against Melbourne.

Personal life
In 2007, Humphries married the daughter of former rugby league player and coach Chris Anderson.

References

Sydney Roosters players
1981 births
Australian rugby league players
Rugby league hookers
Living people